Francisco Grajales Palacios (born 18 August 1956) is a Mexican politician affiliated with the PRI. He currently serves as Deputy of the LXII Legislature of the Mexican Congress representing Chiapas. He also served as Deputy during the LIX Legislature.

References

1956 births
Living people
Politicians from Chiapas
Members of the Chamber of Deputies (Mexico)
Institutional Revolutionary Party politicians
21st-century Mexican politicians
Members of the Senate of the Republic (Mexico)
People from Tonalá, Chiapas